Tristan Gale (born August 10, 1980) is an American skeleton racer who competed from 2001 to 2006. At the 2002 Winter Olympics, she became the inaugural women's skeleton champion. Gale dyed her hair with streaks of red, white and blue for the 2002 Olympics. During the 2002–2003 season, Tristan won a second gold medal on her home track in Salt Lake during a World Cup stop. She remains undefeated at the track in Utah since the Olympics.

Gale also won a bronze medal in the women's skeleton event at the 2003 FIBT World Championships in Nagano. She retired before the 2006 Winter Olympics in Turin. Gale's best overall seasonal finish in the Skeleton World Cup was third in 2002–3.

A native of Ruidoso, New Mexico, Gale lives in Salt Lake City.

References

 20 Questions with Tristan Gale
 FIBT profile
 IOC profile
 List of women's skeleton World Cup champions since 1997.
 Official website
 Thatoneplace.net profile
 United States Olympic Committee
 Women's skeleton Olympic medalists since 2002
 Women's skeleton world championship medalists since 2000

1980 births
American female skeleton racers
Living people
Olympic gold medalists for the United States in skeleton
Olympic skeleton racers of the United States
Sportspeople from Salt Lake City
Skeleton racers at the 2002 Winter Olympics
People from Ruidoso, New Mexico
Olympic medalists in skeleton
Medalists at the 2002 Winter Olympics
21st-century American women